Brian Lee Vickers (born October 24, 1983) is an American professional stock car and sports car racing driver. He last drove the No. 14 Chevrolet SS for Stewart-Haas Racing as an interim driver in the NASCAR Sprint Cup Series for the injured Tony Stewart. He won the 2003 NASCAR Busch Series championship driving for Hendrick Motorsports. Vickers was also among the first series of full-time drivers for Toyota after the manufacturer first entered the Sprint Cup Series.

Vickers' career has been marred by a series of health issues since 2010 that have included blood clots and heart problems.

Racing career

Early years
Vickers began running go karts in 1994. Over the next three years, he won eighty races in the World Karting Association, and won three championships, including the 1995 championship against three-time winner Mike Schwartz. In 1998, he moved to the Allison Legacy Series, and won five races during the course of the season. After competing in the NASCAR Dodge Weekly Racing Series in 1999, he moved to USAR ProCup; and was named Rookie of the Year. He won two races in 2000. In 2001, he won five more races and finished second in points.

Vickers made his Busch Series debut in the 2001 GNC Live Well 250 at Milwaukee in the No. 29 car; owned by his father Clyde Vickers' BLV Motorsports team. He qualified thirtieth and finished thirty-seventh after a crash. Vickers ran three more races that season; his best finish being 25th at North Carolina. In 2002, Vickers began running the Busch Series in his father's No. 40 Dodge Intrepid. He drove in twenty-one races, competing for Rookie of the Year honors; his best finish was seventh in the Hardee's 250 at Richmond, his only top ten of the season on his way to finishing thirtieth in series points.

2003
Due to a lack of funding for his family-owned team, Vickers was hired to replace Ricky Hendrick in the No. 5 GMAC-sponsored Chevrolet owned by Hendrick Motorsports. In 2003, Vickers won three races and the championship by fourteen points over David Green. Vickers became the then-youngest champion in Busch Series history at only 20 years old. Vickers made his Cup debut in the 2003 UAW-GM Quality 500 at Charlotte; qualifying 20th and finishing 33rd in the No. 60 Haas Automation-sponsored Chevy. He ran four more races that season in Hendrick's No. 25 UAW/Delphi-sponsored Chevy; qualifying in the Top 5 each time, but posting only one Top 20 finish.

2004

In 2004, Vickers ran the No. 25 in the Cup Series full-time carrying sponsorships from Ditech and GMAC. He won two poles, had four Top 10s, and finished third behind Kasey Kahne and Brendan Gaughan for Rookie of the Year.

2005
In 2005, Vickers won the Nextel Open exhibition race. He was right behind Mike Bliss on the last lap. Rather than make a move to go around Bliss, Vickers ran into the back of the No. 0, spinning him out. Vickers went on to win. That qualified him for the annual Nextel All-Star Challenge, in which he finished third. Vickers finished the year seventeenth in Cup points with ten top tens including career runs at the Pocono 500 and the Coca-Cola 600. He also returned to the Busch Series in a limited capacity in 2005, and finished third at Watkins Glen in the No. 5. He drove five other races in the No. 57.

2006
Vickers started out the 2006 season with a seventh-place finish in the Daytona 500. He went on to finish fifteenth in points with nine top tens, including a win at Talladega. However, the season was marred by conflicts within Hendrick Motorsports. On June 25, Vickers announced that he would leave Hendrick and drive for the new Team Red Bull in 2007. In the UAW-Ford 500, Dale Earnhardt Jr. was leading with Jimmie Johnson in second and Vickers in third on the final lap. Going down the backstretch, Johnson attempted to pass Dale Jr. on the inside and Vickers tried to follow Jimmie. Unfourtunately, Vickers was too late to follow Johnson to the inside and instead hooked Jimmie in the right rear causing Johnson to turn right into Dale Jr. and the two went spinning down to the infield to bring out the caution. Vickers went on to score his first victory. Johnson was livid with Vickers, and both he and his crew chief Chad Knaus questioned Vickers' motives with the bump, leading Knaus to state that Vickers had "run out of talent" prior to wrecking his teammate. Fortunately for Vickers, Jimmie Johnson ended up winning the 2006 NEXTEL Cup Series Championship at Homestead-Miami Speedway leaving that race at Talladega behind. In 2006, Vickers also won a one-off race for Hendrick in the Autozone West Series at Sonoma.

2007

In 2007, Vickers drove the No. 83 Red Bull-sponsored Toyota Camry for the new Team Red Bull, with crew chief Doug Richert, as a teammate to A. J. Allmendinger.

This season started out poorly when Vickers suffered a blown tire during his qualifying race for the Daytona 500; causing him to fail to qualify. The next week, the team regrouped, however, and scored a tenth-place finish in their first outing, the Auto Club 500 at California, which was coincidentally Toyota's first top 10 in the Cup Series. Two weeks later, Vickers led Toyota's first lap in the Cup series at Atlanta.

On May 27, 2007, Vickers gave Toyota its first top five ever in the Coca-Cola 600. Toyota brought a new engine to Charlotte, and Vickers showed its potential and surprised many by leading more than seventy laps of the race and having the dominant car. However, towards the end of the race, the power steering of the vehicle began to fail, and eventually ceased operation completely. The team's luck continued to decline as Vickers soon blew a tire and slid into the turn four wall. Immediately as Vickers entered pit road, the caution flew for debris on the track; supposedly from his car. This was a saving grace, as it allowed the No. 83 car to stay on the lead lap; albeit off the pace and out of contention for the win. Richert managed to salvage the race through pit strategy; enabling Vickers to score a fifth-place finish.

Late in the 2007 season, Richert was fired from Team Red Bull and replaced by Randy Cox, who was formerly employed on Team Red Bull's Research and Development team. Vickers struggled for the remainder of the season as Team Red Bull began to focus on developing its Car of Tomorrow program, which would start competing full-time the next season. The resulting inattention to its "current car" program severely hampered Vickers' efforts during the remaining races of that platform. It was another problem in a long line for the entire Red Bull organization, as Vickers finished thirty-eighth in points and failed to qualify for thirteen races while his teammate Allmendinger missed nineteen races and finished forty-third. One of Vickers' failures to make the race was due to a disqualification from the lineup of the 2007 Lenox Industrial Tools 300, after his car failed post-qualifying inspection three times.

2008

In 2008, Vickers, with new crew chief Kevin Hamlin, qualified for the fiftieth running of the Daytona 500 after racing himself in the field with an eleventh-place finish in the Gatorade Duel. He went on to make the next four races with an average finish of twenty-first including a ninth-place finish at Atlanta.

Vickers' pit crew won the 2008 Pit Crew Challenge during the All-Star weekend. Vickers went on the next weekend and led sixty-one laps in the Coca-Cola 600 before he lost his left rear wheel and crashed about halfway through the race. Vickers then followed up with a 2nd-place run at Pocono to Kasey Kahne.

2009: Only Chase Appearance

For the 2009 season, Vickers got a new crew chief: Ryan Pemberton. It was announced he has picked up an additional sponsor in Mighty Auto Parts.

Vickers' season began with controversy in the Daytona 500. Dale Earnhardt Jr. got a run on the backstretch to the inside of Vickers, but Vickers blocked. Earnhardt Jr. clipped the left rear fender; getting Vickers loose sending him into the field. Vickers said after the race that Earnhardt should have been black-flagged. Earnhardt later stated that he was unaware that Vickers was a lap down, and that both were fighting for the Lucky Dog position. Earnhardt later apologized.

Vickers won the pole for the Auto Club 500, but had to go to the rear because of an engine change. Vickers went on to finish 10th.

Vickers ran in the top five all day during the Kobalt Tools 500. In the final laps, Vickers was chasing down Kurt Busch for the win, but Robby Gordon blew a tire to bring out the caution; allowing Jeff Gordon and Carl Edwards to catch Vickers on the restart. Vickers finished 5th.

Vickers won his second pole of the season for the Crown Royal 400 at Richmond. Vickers would finish fifteenth in that race.

On June 10, 2009, Team Red Bull conducted a promotional pit stop in New York City. Brian pulled the No. 83 Red Bull Toyota to the side of the road and the team changed four tires in Times Square with traffic still moving around them.

Vickers won his third pole of the season for the Lifelock 400 at Michigan. Vickers never led a lap in the race, and earned a ninth-place finish.

Vickers won his fourth pole of the season for the Toyota/Save Mart 350 at Sonoma. Vickers finished sixteenth in that race.

Vickers won his fifth pole of the season for the Lifelock.com 400 at Chicagoland. Vickers finished seventh in the race.

Vickers won his sixth pole of the season at Michigan. He also won the pole for the Carfax 250. In the Nationwide race, he and his former teammate Kyle Busch were racing hard for the lead on the final lap; allowing the NASCAR rookie Brad Keselowski to pass both of them for the win. After the race, Busch confronted Vickers on pit road accusing him of rough driving.

The next day, Vickers won the Carfax 400 from the pole for his second career Sprint Cup victory, Red Bull's first victory, and Toyota's first victory at Michigan. He did so after a late race gamble of not coming in to pit during the race's final caution. On the final restart, Vickers was first and Jimmie Johnson was second. With a little over forty laps to go, Vickers stayed behind Johnson most of the time; trying to save fuel. With just over three laps to go, Johnson ran out of fuel, while Vickers barely had enough to claim the win. This victory was also the first one for Red Bull Racing and the first for Red Bull's sponsorship in NASCAR.

Two days after the win, Vickers signed a multi-year extension with Red Bull.

After finishing seventh in the Chevy Rock and Roll 400 at Richmond, Vickers clinched a spot in the 2009 Chase for the Sprint Cup. He would finish twelfth in the standings; his highest points finish to date. His six poles in 2009 were second to Mark Martin's seven for most poles of the year.

2010
On May 13, 2010, it was announced that Vickers, who had earned three top 10s in the first 11 races, would not be participating in the Autism Speaks 400  at Dover International Speedway due to an undisclosed medical condition, later revealed to be blood clots in his legs and around his lungs. Casey Mears was announced as his replacement. This ended a streak of 87 consecutive starts, which dated back to Atlanta in 2007. Vickers hoped to run a handful of laps before handing the car over to a relief driver in order to earn points, but was not medically cleared.

On May 21, 2010, six days after being released from a hospital for the aforementioned blood clot issue, it was announced that Vickers would miss the remainder of the season. His replacements were Casey Mears, Reed Sorenson, Mattias Ekstrom, Boris Said, and Kasey Kahne. Vickers' abbreviated 2010 season consisted of three top 10s in eleven races.

2011

Vickers was cleared to race in 2011. His season started out in the big one at Daytona, where he  finished 31st. A week later at Phoenix, he was involved in the big one again when Matt Kenseth and him made contact; triggering a 13-car pileup. Vickers was involved in two other notable run-ins with Kenseth in the fall races at Martinsville and Phoenix as well as run-ins with Tony Stewart at Sonoma, Marcos Ambrose at Richmond, and Jamie McMurray at Martinsville. He would finish the year 25th in points with seven top 10s. After season's end, Red Bull shut down its Cup Series team, leaving Vickers without a ride for 2012. BK Racing bought the assets and offered Vickers a ride for 2012 but he declined, leaving Vickers on the sidelines.

2012
Vickers started the 2012 season without a ride, but it was announced in early March that he would drive the No. 55 Toyota for Michael Waltrip Racing at both races at Bristol, Martinsville, and Loudon, sharing the ride with Mark Martin and Michael Waltrip. In his first race in the No. 55, Vickers dominated the first half of the race, leading for 125 laps. He would eventually finish 5th. On March 30, Michael Waltrip Racing announced that Vickers would drive at Sonoma, and Watkins Glen, expanding his race schedule to eight races in the No. 55.  Vickers also drove the team's AF Corse-Waltrip No. 61 Ferrari in the GTE-AM class for the FIA World Endurance Championship at the 6 Hours of Spa and the 24 Heures du Mans. Vickers announced at the fall Martinsville race that he renewed his contract with MWR and will race 9 more times in the No. 55 car next year sharing the ride with Mark Martin (24) and Michael Waltrip (3). Additionally, Vickers will return to the Nationwide Series full-time, driving for Joe Gibbs Racing.

2013

For his 2013 season, Vickers performed well at Bristol. His second ride in the No. 55 at Martinsville was unlucky. He had crashed in the early laps and after repairing his car, got back on the lead lap and then spun around. After again getting back on to the lead lap, on the final lap of the race he passed Danica Patrick for 11th place. Seconds later he was intentionally spun by Kevin Harvick who was angry with Vickers for prior contact. In reply Vickers bumped Harvick when entering pit road after the race was over; he climbed out and the two briefly argued. Vickers ran the No. 11 FedEx Toyota at Texas, Kansas and Richmond for an injured Denny Hamlin. Though Hamlin returned at Talladega for the Aaron's 499, Vickers substituted for him on lap 23, though he was eventually collected in The Big One less than 15 laps after the switch.

At Sonoma, Vickers started in 34th place in his 3rd ride for MWR in the No. 55 Toyota. He led 4 laps and had a very fast racecar, even though he had to start at the rear of the field because Jason Bowles had qualified the car as Vickers was racing at Road America. While his MWR teammates Martin Truex Jr. and Clint Bowyer ended up in the top ten, with Truex winning, Vickers ended up in 13th place.

Vickers led 63 laps in the Nationwide Series race at New Hampshire Motor Speedway but finished second to Kyle Busch. Ironically, the next day, Vickers held off Busch to win his third career Sprint Cup Series race during the 2013 Camping World RV Sales 301 at New Hampshire after making a late race pass on Tony Stewart, and retaining the lead on a green-white-checkered finish as Stewart ran out of fuel. For Vickers, this broke a 75-race winless streak (not counting the races he had missed in 2010). On August 13, 2013, Vickers was announced as the full-time driver of the No. 55 for the 2014 and 2015 seasons; on August 19, it was announced that following the release of Mark Martin to substitute for the injured Tony Stewart, Vickers would drive the No. 55 in twelve of the season's final 13 races, the exception being Talladega, where Michael Waltrip will drive the car, as previously scheduled.

After the Federated Auto Parts 400 in early September, Vickers was determined to be one of the drivers involved in an attempt to manipulate the race so Michael Waltrip Racing teammate Martin Truex Jr. would earn a spot in the Chase for the Sprint Cup. The team was fined a record $300,000 and 50 championship points were deducted per car.

On October 14, 2013, it was announced that Vickers would be forced to sit out the rest of the season due to the discovery of a blood clot in his right calf, a similar issue to the one that caused him to sit out much of 2010; Elliott Sadler substituted for Vickers in the No. 55 Sprint Cup car in the final four races of the season.

2014

In August 2013, Michael Waltrip Racing announced that Vickers would drive the No. 55 full-time starting in 2014. Billy Scott was named Vickers' crew chief, having previously served as lead engineer of the No. 55 team for the past two seasons. Vickers' best finish of the year was a 2nd at the Coke Zero 400 at Daytona when the rain came in and Vickers missed a huge 25 car pileup and a 4th at Texas when he took two tires on the final stop.

2015
On December 15, 2014, it was announced that Vickers would miss part of the 2015 season due to health issues. Vickers said that his body had been rejecting an artificial patch which had been inserted in 2010 to fix a hole in his heart. He had corrective surgery in December to repair the hole that was a success, and said that he would need time for rest and rehabilitation. Vickers implied in January that he only would miss a few races. On January 21, 2015, it was announced that Vickers had been medically cleared to return to racing in March, with his season debut expected at Las Vegas Motor Speedway on March 8. It was also announced that NASCAR had granted him a waiver to make him eligible for the Chase for the Sprint Cup championship should he qualify.

Vickers' replacements in the 55 were team boss Michael Waltrip and MWR test driver Brett Moffitt. Before the 2015 Auto Club 400, it was announced that Vickers would again be sidelined because of more blood clots.  While Vickers is sidelined, his sponsor on the 55 car will be Janssen Pharmaceutica and their brand of Xarelto.  His replacement would again be Moffitt. The same week, Vickers also announced he would be taking blood thinner medication and cannot race for at least three months. On April 28, MWR announced that David Ragan would drive the 55 for the rest of the season. Vickers did not run another race for the rest of 2015.

With his racing future uncertain, Vickers joined NASCAR on NBC as an analyst and worked selected Sprint Cup races on the network during the season.

2016

In 2016, Stewart-Haas Racing hired Vickers as an interim driver of its No. 14 Chevrolet SS for all the NASCAR Sprint Cup Series events with all sponsors besides Bass Pro Shops (which Ty Dillon was hired for) after Tony Stewart was injured in a sand rail accident. Vickers' best finish of the season was 7th at Martinsville for the running of the STP 500.

Personal life
The son of Clyde and Ramona Vickers, Vickers was born in Thomasville, North Carolina, and now resides in a suburb of New York City.

He is married to Sarah Kellen, user of the alias Sarah Kensington, who is known for her alleged role as the "sex scheduler" in Jeffrey Epstein's sex trafficking of underage girls. She was given federal immunity under Epstein's non-prosecution agreement. New York federal prosecutors say they aren't bound by a deal signed by Miami federal prosecutors.

Motorsports career results

NASCAR
(key) (Bold – Pole position awarded by qualifying time. Italics – Pole position earned by points standings or practice time. * – Most laps led.)

Sprint Cup Series

Daytona 500

Nationwide Series

Autozone West Series

 Season still in progress
 Ineligible for series points
 Ineligible for series points, and was penalized 50 points at fall Richmond

24 Hours of Le Mans results

References

External links

 
 

Living people
1983 births
People from Thomasville, North Carolina
Racing drivers from North Carolina
24 Hours of Le Mans drivers
NASCAR drivers
NASCAR Xfinity Series champions
CARS Tour drivers
FIA World Endurance Championship drivers
Hendrick Motorsports drivers
Joe Gibbs Racing drivers
Michael Waltrip Racing drivers
Stewart-Haas Racing drivers
AF Corse drivers